Julius Oscar Hinze (J. O. Hinze in most of his publications, 1907–1993) was a Dutch scientist specialized in fluid dynamics. He was the author of the textbook Turbulence (1959; 1975; US: McGraw-Hill). Throughout his career, he mostly stayed in Delft University of Technology.

The term Hinze scale (sometimes Kolmogorov-Hinze scale) in turbulence research is named after him.

Publications 
In chronological order:
 Die Erzeugung von Ringwellen auf einer Flüssigkeitsoberfläche durch periodisch wirkende Druckkräfte (1936)
 Atomization of Liquids by Means of a Rotating Cup (1950)
 Fundamentals of the hydrodynamic mechanism of splitting in dispersion processes (1955) 
 The Effect of Compressibility on the Turbulent Transport of Heat in a Stably Stratified Atmosphere (1959)
 Turbulence (with M. S. Uberoi, 1960)
 On the hydrodynamics of turbidity currents (1960) 
 Secondary Currents in Wall Turbulence (1967)
 Fine-structure turbulence in the wall region of a turbulent boundary layer (1975)
 Memory effects in turbulence (1975)
 Rotation of the Reynolds' stress tensor in a decaying grid-generated turbulent flow (with P. J. H. Builtjes, 1977)

References

External links 
 

1907 births
1993 deaths
Fluid dynamicists
20th-century Dutch mathematicians
20th-century Dutch physicists